Balog nad Ipl'om  (1232 Bolug, 1351 Balogh)  is a village and municipality in the Veľký Krtíš District of the Banská Bystrica Region of southern Slovakia.

History
In historical records, the village was first mentioned in 1232 when the King of Hungary, Andrew II gave the village to Zvolen (Zólyom) town. After, for four centuries it belonged to local noble family Baloghy (Balogov). From 1939 to 1944 it belonged to Hungary again.

Notable births
 Béla Pásztor, mayor of Veresegyház

Genealogical resources

The records for genealogical research are available at the state archive "Statny Archiv in Banska Bystrica, Slovakia"

 Roman Catholic church records (births/marriages/deaths): 1771-1895
 Lutheran church records (births/marriages/deaths): 1721-1750, 1784-1862
 Census records 1869 of Balog_nad_Iplom are not available at the state archive.

See also
 List of municipalities and towns in Slovakia

External links
Official homepage of the village Balog nad Ipľom
https://web.archive.org/web/20080111223415/http://www.statistics.sk/mosmis/eng/run.html 
Surnames of living people in Balog_nad_Iplom
http://www.e-obce.sk/obec/balognadiplom/balog-nad-iplom.html

Villages and municipalities in Veľký Krtíš District
Hungarian communities in Slovakia